Diprion pini, the common pine sawfly, is a sawfly species in the family Diprionidae. It is a serious pest of economic forestry, capable of defoliating large areas of pine forest. A major effect of the herbivore disturbance of Diprion pini is climate change. Since it feeds until late in the autumn, affected trees are weakened and often die in the subsequent winter. The species is found all across Europe, with outliers elsewhere. It affects the Scots pine, mountain pine, eastern white pine, Monterey pine, lodgepole pine and black pine. Scots pines are not generally killed by a single defoliation, but weakened trees may suffer increased attack by bark beetles, buprestid beetles, and pine weevils, which can kill trees, as can repeated defoliation. During high rates of defoliation, the growth rate of pines decreases significantly.

References

External links
 CABI datasheet

Tenthredinoidea
Insect pests of temperate forests
Hymenoptera of Europe
Taxa named by Carl Linnaeus
Sawflies described in 1758